Ben Blair is a 1916 American drama silent film directed by William Desmond Taylor and written by Julia Crawford Ivers and William Otis Lillibridge. The film stars Dustin Farnum, Winifred Kingston, Herbert Standing, Lamar Johnstone, Virginia Foltz and Frank A. Bonn. The film was released on March 9, 1916, by Paramount Pictures.

Plot

Cast 
Dustin Farnum as Ben Blair
Winifred Kingston as Florence Winthrop
Herbert Standing as James Winthrop
Lamar Johnstone as Scott Winthrop
Virginia Foltz as Mrs. Scott Winthrop
Frank A. Bonn as John Rankin
Fred Burns as Tom Blair
Gordon Griffith as Ben Blair, as a child

Preservation
This film survives in the Library of Congress collection.

References

External links 
 
 

1916 films
1910s English-language films
Silent American drama films
1916 drama films
Paramount Pictures films
Films directed by William Desmond Taylor
American black-and-white films
American silent feature films
1910s American films